The Lorraine 12D, also referred to as Lorraine-Dietrich 12D, was a series of water-cooled V12 engines produced by the French company Lorraine-Dietrich. The first variant began production in 1917, and the engines were used to power bombers for the French Navy during World War I. The Lorraine 12Da variant was the most powerful French engine at the time. After the war, the engines were licensed and produced by the Italian firm Isotta Fraschini until 1925.

Design and development
In 1916, French engineer Marius Barbarou began working a new V12 engine oriented at a 60-degree angle and a  bore, to improve on the existing Lorraine-Dietrich 8B engine by adding two cylinders on each side. Lorraine produced 50 of the 12D engines. The Lorraine 12Da variant became the most powerful French airplane engine at the time of World War I. The more powerful design resulted in a heavier powertrain due to added radiators for cooling. The extra weight meant that the planes could operate for two hours on the available fuel supply. The engines continued to be used by the military, but were unsuitable for commercial use due to the limited travel range.

The engines were mass produced at a factory in Argenteuil, to meet demands of the French Navy for bombers. At the time of the armistice of 11 November 1918, Lorraine had hundreds of surplus engines which were later used in French Navy prototypes. New models were not developed during this time, and Lorraine halted production of the 12D engines in 1922. In 1924 the Italian company Isotta Fraschini bought the rights for the engine under the license of the 12Db, and later marketed the engine under its own company name, Isotta Fraschini 12Db until 1925.

Variants
The Lorraine 12D had several variants produced which included:

Applications

The Lorraine 12D powered the first Groupe Latécoère planes. The 12Da was mounted on the CAMS 37 prototype seaplane, and later used on the first Potez planes. The successor 12Db engine was used mostly by the Farman Aviation Works, and the Société Latham. Isotta Fraschini 12Db used the Lorraine engines to power Italian aircraft including the Macchi M.7, Macchi M.24bis and Caproni Ca.73bis.

Complete list of planes powered by the Lorraine 12D:

12D
 Halbronn H.T.2, Latécoère 5, Latécoère 16

12Da
 CAMS 37 (prototype), Latham 43, Lioré et Olivier LeO H-10, SEA IV, Potez SEA VII, Potez IX, Potez XII, Farman F.120, Percheron 18

12Db
 Besson MB.26, Latham E-5, Lioré et Olivier LeO 12, Levasseur PL.3, Potez XI, Potez XV, Potez XVII, Potez 23, Potez 27, Farman F.60 Goliath, Farman F.62, Farman F.63bis, Farman F.122, Farman F.140 Super Goliath, Farman F.150bis, Breda A.7 L.D., Breda A.8, CANT 6ter, CANT 10ter, Caproni Ca.71, Caproni Ca.73bis, Macchi M.7, Macchi M.24bis, Savoia-Marchetti S.59, Yokosuka E1Y

12Dc
 Farman F.72, Lioré et Olivier LeO H-10

Specifications (12Da)

See also

 List of aircraft engines

References

External links 
 

Lorraine aircraft engines
Pages with unreviewed translations
1910s aircraft piston engines